Sissonville High School is a public high school in Sissonville, West Virginia, USA. It is one of the eight public high schools in the Kanawha County School district. It serves students in grades 9 through 12.

History 
In October 2001, the Katie Sierra free speech case made national news when she was suspended for her activism in opposition to the bombing of Afghanistan.

Arts

Band
The Sissonville High School Band program is under the direction of Corey Green, and consists of 3 major ensembles; "The Pride of Sissonville" Marching Band, Concert Band, and Jazz Band.

"The Pride" has won many awards at the local, regional, and national levels, with high placements at both the Tournament of Bands Atlantic Coast Championships and Cavalcade of Bands Finals. They were the 2014 (87.40) and 2015 (92.25) Cavalcade of Bands National Champions for the Independence A division.

The band participates in the annual Gazette-Mail Kanawha County Majorette and Band Festival as well as other local parades and exhibitions.

Touch of Class Show Choir
The Touch of Class Show Choir has won many awards throughout the years including: Best Male Soloist, Best Female Soloist, Class C Champion, and Grand Champions.

Touch of Class has had many themes for their main show, some notable themes include: Live in Living Color, The Game of Life, The Money Show, The Party Show, Light the Fire Within, Celebrating Music, and A Day In The Life.

Back in 2011, Sissonville High School's auditorium was completely redone, and new equipment was added as old was replaced. Lots of show choir shows, performances, prom fashion shows, talent shows, and theater productions were performed on that very stage.

Theatre

Athletics
Baseball
Basketball
Cheerleading
Football 
Golf
Soccer
Softball
Tennis
Track
Cross Country
Volleyball
Boys Volleyball
Wrestling
Swimming
Robotics

See also

 List of high schools in West Virginia

References

External links
 Official website
 Alumni website
 History of Sissonville High School
 Sissonville Band website

Schools in Kanawha County, West Virginia
Public high schools in West Virginia